The Burrowers is a 2008 Western horror film written and directed by J. T. Petty. The film is based on an original short film, Blood Red Earth directed by Petty.

Plot
The year is 1879, and beyond the fringes of civilization a handful of pioneers maintain settlements while exploring the unknown territories. One night, a family from one of these settlements is brutally dragged into darkness by a group of unknown invaders. At first the kidnappers are thought to be hostile Native Americans, and a posse forms to bring the family back home safely.

Venturing out into the unmapped territories is an Irish immigrant desperate to find his lost love, a naïve teen eager to prove his worth, a freedman seeking his fortune, and a hardened pair of battle-weary Indian fighters. But nature's wrath and the tomahawks of hostile tribes are not the only threats that this group will be forced to confront, because as the bodies begin to multiply and the truth about the abductors gradually emerges, these rescuers will find out that there are forces in this world that cannot be described in human terms—and that seem to have motivations beyond our comprehension.

A species, called "Burrowers" by the Natives, used to subsist on buffalo. When white settlers depleted the buffalo, the species began to survive on human meat – first hunting nearby Indians and later the settlers. One tribe in particular, the Ute, have experience in combating the hunter-species. The "Burrowers" first lace their victims by cutting them and drugging them with a toxin. The victim is then buried alive and eaten only after decomposition has begun. By the time the film's protagonists meet up with the Ute their numbers are severely depleted, but the Ute method of drugging someone already infected with "Burrower" toxin proves effective. When the "Burrowers" go to eat the twice drugged victim they themselves fall asleep and are vulnerable, especially to the rays of the sun, which are the only apparent thing that can kill them. However, the surviving member of the posse, the Irishman Coffey, is unable to discover exactly what the Ute used to drug the "Burrowers", as most of the remaining Ute are executed by the overzealous cavalry. The film ends with the suggestion that the "Burrower" attacks will continue.

Cast

Release

The Burrowers was first screened at the Toronto International Film Festival on September 9, 2008.

Home media
The film was released on DVD by Lionsgate and Maple Pictures in the United States and Canada respectively on April 21, 2009.

Critical response

The Burrowers received mostly positive reviews upon its release, with critics praising the film's blending of horror and western genres, cinematography, and character development. On review aggregator Rotten Tomatoes, the film holds an approval rating of 75%, based on 12 reviews, and an average rating of 6.02/10.

Karina Longworth of IndieWire praised the cinematography, and screenplay, noting that the film "plays less like a horror film than a Terrence Malick film, with a mythological MacGuffin designed to reveal dark truths about the men forced to deal with it." Adrian Halen from HorrorNews.net offered the film similar praise, while noting that the film was more focused on its characters rather than its title antagonists.

See also
Weird West
Tremors 4: The Legend Begins
Native American

References

External links

 
 
 

2008 films
2008 horror films
2000s Western (genre) horror films
2000s monster movies
American Western (genre) horror films
American science fiction horror films
Films directed by J. T. Petty
Films set in 1879
Films shot in New Mexico
2000s English-language films
2000s American films